In shogi, Double Ranging Rook (also Double Swinging Rook, Mutual Swinging Rook) (相振り飛車 ai-furibisha) is a class of Ranging Rook openings in which both players choose a Ranging Rook position.

The term does not apply when one player (or both) moves their rook to their respective fourth or third files (Right Fourth File Rook, Sleeve Rook) as these are still considered to be Static Rook positions.

Double Ranging Rook games were relatively rare compared with Double Static Rook and Static Rook vs Ranging Rook games. However, more recently, they have gained in popularity somewhat as Fairbairn noted in the 1980s.

The most often played game among professionals is Black's Opposing Rook vs White's Third File Rook.

Opposing Rook vs Third File Rook

1. P-76 P-34.

2. P-66.

2...R-32.

Opposing Rook's early eighth pawn advance variation

3. B-77.

Opposing Rook's left silver development

3. S-78.

Third File Rook's Mino castle with delayed 35 pawn push variation

3...K-62.

4. S-67.

4...S-72. Here White starts to create the Mino castle structure giving up the possibility of making a Bear-in-the-hole castle.

5. B-77. Moving up the bishop to the seventh file allows a space on the 88 square for the rook to move to. Additionally, the bishop needs to be defended by the left knight as left silver and left gold will eventually be moved to different locations.

5...K-71. The king hunkers down.

6. R-88.

6...S-42.

7. P-86.

7...P-54.

8. P-85.

8...S-53.

9. K-48.

9...G49-52.

9. G69-58.

Transpositions

The opening position above can be reached by different move sequences, some of which are shown below.

{|
|   || Black
| White 
| style="padding-left: 2.5em;" |  
| Black
| White 
|-
| 1. || P-76 || P-34	|| || P-76 || P-34
|-
| 2. || P-66 || R-32	|| || P-66 || P-56
|-
| 3. || B-77 || K-62	|| || S-78 || S-42
|-
| 4. || S-78 || S-72	|| || S-67 || S-53
|-
| 5. || S-67 || K-71	|| || B-77 || R-32
|-
| 6. || R-88 || S-42	|| || R-88 || K-62
|-
| 7. || P-86 || P-54	|| || P-86 || S-72
|-
| 8. || P-85 || S-53	|| || P-85 || K-71
|-
| 9. || K-48 || G49-52	|| || K-48 || G41-52
|-
| 10. || G69-58 ||  || || G69-58 ||  
|}

Third File Rook's early 3e pawn push variation

Double Opposing Rook

Third File Rook vs Third File Rook

Third File Rook vs Opposing Rook

Ishida vs Opposing Rook Early P14

1. P76 P34, 2. P75. Ishida position by Black.

2...P14. White's early edge pawn push.

Black closing their bishop diagonal and aims for the Gold Excelsior castle.

White aims for a Mino castle and develops the left knight for attacking.

A left edge attack may be possible for White.

Game example: Toshiaki Kubo vs Hisashi Namekata's Meijin ranking tournament on March 15, 2015.

Fourth File Rook vs Third File Rook

Fourth File to Third File Rook

４→３戦法

The player starts off playing a Fourth File Rook position with an open bishop diagonal that then transitions to a Third File Rook position after the player moves their king into an Incomplete Mino castle. This strategy is flexible to be used against a Ranging Rook opponent (for a Double Ranging Rook game) as well as against a Static Rook opponent.

Fourth File Rook vs Fourth File Rook

See also

 Ranging Rook

References

Bibliography

 
 Fujii, Takeshi 2007 相振り飛車を指しこなす本. Vol. 1.
 Fujii, Takeshi 2007 相振り飛車を指しこなす本. Vol. 2.
 Fujii, Takeshi 2008 相振り飛車を指しこなす本. Vol. 3.
 Fujii, Takeshi 2008 相振り飛車を指しこなす本. Vol. 4.

External links

 Shogi Shack: Aifuribisha Murata
 Shogi Opening: Black Opposite Rook vs White 3rd File Rook
 Shogi (etc) Diary in Japan: 
 How To Attack In Double Swinging Rook (1)
 How To Attack In Double Swinging Rook (2)
 How To Attack In Double Swinging Rook (3)
 K System (Original Tactics)
 Lectures on the Latest Strategies: Lecture 6: Double Ranging Rook

Shogi openings
Double Ranging Rook openings
Ranging Rook openings